The ARIA Music Award for Best Rock Album, is an award presented at the annual ARIA Music Awards, which recognises "the many achievements of Aussie artists across all music genres", since 1987. It is handed out by the Australian Recording Industry Association (ARIA), an organisation whose aim is "to advance the interests of the Australian record industry." To be eligible, the recording must be an album in the contemporary rock, modern rock and active rock formats, and cannot be entered in other genre categories. The accolade is voted for by the ARIA Judging Academy, which consists of 1000 members from different areas of the music industry, and is given to a solo artist or group who is either from Australia or an Australian resident.

The award for Best Rock Album has been won by Powderfinger the most time, with three wins, for:  Internationalist (1999), Odyssey Number Five (2000) and Vulture Street.

Winners and nominees
In the following table, the winner is highlighted in a separate colour, and in boldface; the nominees are those that are not highlighted or in boldface.

References

External links
The ARIA Awards Official website

H
A
Album awards